Cristiana Capotondi (born 13 September 1980) is an Italian actress.

Early life and career 
Capotondi was born in Rome to an Italian family of mixed Italian Catholic and Italian Jewish background (her maternal grandfather was Jewish). Growing up in Rome, she celebrated both Christian and Jewish holidays, such as Yom Kippur and Rosh Hashanah, and visited both church and synagogue. She graduated from the Università La Sapienza in Rome with a degree in communication sciences.

Capotondi first gained popularity in a commercial ad for the "Maxibon Motta" ice cream. Her acting career began at the age of thirteen in the Italian series Amico mio, aired by RAI.

Capotondi debuted in cinema in 1995 with the comedy Vacanze di Natale '95.  Between 1993 and 2006 she worked mostly in television, starring in 2004–2006 in the series Orgoglio, aired on Rai Uno. She gained additional exposure in the film Notte prima degli esami (2006), in which she starred as a main character alongside Nicolas Vaporidis. In 2009 Capotondi played Empress Elisabeth of Austria in the ZDF/Rai Uno/ORF co-production Sisi.

She has been the spokeswoman of the 2011 Giro d'Italia.

Personal life 
After a ten-year relationship with a man who was not part of the entertainment world, she dated colleagues Nicolas Vaporidis and Primo Reggiani. Since 2006 she has been engaged to the entrepreneur and former TV presenter Andrea Pezzi.

Filmography

References

External links

 

1980 births
Living people
Italian film actresses
21st-century Italian Jews
Actresses from Rome
Italian stage actresses
Italian television actresses
Sapienza University of Rome alumni
Jewish actresses
21st-century Italian women